Gunter Building is a historic commercial building located at Spruce Pine in Mitchell County, North Carolina, United States.  It was built about 1941, and is a two-story, three bay by four bay, building constructed of river-tumbled micaceous biotite.  It was built by local stonemasons Charlie Mitchell and Dave Greene for the Belk-Broome Company.

It was added to the National Register of Historic Places in 2002.  It is located in the Downtown Spruce Pine Historic District.

References

Commercial buildings on the National Register of Historic Places in North Carolina
Commercial buildings completed in 1941
Buildings and structures in Mitchell County, North Carolina
National Register of Historic Places in Mitchell County, North Carolina
Historic district contributing properties in North Carolina